Tharini Mudaliar is an South African born Australian actress, singer, and violinist. She is best known for her role portraying the fictional character Kamala in The Matrix Revolutions. She is also recognized by fans of Xena: Warrior Princess where she played the role of Naiyima in the Episode Between the Lines.

Filmography

References
"BEHIND THE LINES"
Warner Brothers profile

External links

Living people
Australian film actresses
Australian women singers
Australian people of Tamil descent
Australian stage actresses
Australian violinists
Australian Hindus
South African emigrants to Australia
Tamil musicians
Actresses in Tamil cinema
Year of birth missing (living people)
University of Sydney alumni
South African people of Tamil descent
21st-century violinists